Salma Umm al-Khayr bint Sakhar (Salmā ʾUmm al-Khayr ibnat Ṣakhar) was the companion of Islamic prophet Muhammad and was the mother of Abu Bakr, the first Rashidun Caliph.

Biography

Salma was the daughter of Sakhar ibn Amir ibn Amr, from the Taym clan of the Quraysh, and the brother of her uncle Uthman ibn Amir, later known as 'Abu Qahafa'. Her kunya was Umm Al-Khayr ("Mother of Goodness").

Salma married Abu Quhafa and had several sons who did not survive infancy. When Abu Bakr was born in 573, Salma took him to the Kaaba and prayed to the gods: “If this one is granted immunity from death, then bestow him upon me!” Abu Bakr was therefore known as Atiq (" the exempted"), while his subsequent surviving brothers were given the related names Mu'taq and Utayq.

Salma was an early convert to Islam. She was among those who were "brought to the house of Arqam" to meet Muhammad, i.e., after 614 but before the Hijra.

She died during the Caliphate of her son Abu Bakr between 632 and 634.

Legacy 
Sunnis honour her as Umm al-Khayr, meaning "Mother of Goodness", referring to Abu Bakr, whom Sunni Muslims honour as one of The Ten Promised Paradise among Muhammad's early companions, the Sahaba.

Family tree

References

External links 
 Anwary-Islam.com

Women companions of the Prophet
6th-century Arabs
7th-century Arabs